The Gambling Ghost is a 1991 Hong Kong action comedy film directed by Clifton Ko. It stars Sammo Hung in three roles as different generations of the same family - son, father and ghostly grandfather. Hung's co-star, Man Hoi also worked as the film's action director.

The opening scene of the film parodies another Hong Kong film, God of Gamblers.

Cast
 Sammo Hung - Fatty Big Brock / Fat Bao (Fatty's father) / Hung Kau/Gao
 Nina Li Chi - Miss Lily (as Nina Li)
 Mang Hoi - Hoi Siu-Hon (as Man Hoi)
 James Wong - Rich Brother Dragon 
 Teddy Yip Wing-Cho - Yau Mo-Leung (Kau's Partner) (as Ip Wing Cho)
 Wu Ma - Uncle Ng (as Ng Ma)
 Corey Yuen - Gambler Wah
 Chung Fat - Driver 
 Stanley Fung - Motorcycle Cop (as Fung Shu Fan)
 Lam Ching-ying - Exorcist 
 Richard Ng - Roadblock Cop #1 (as Ricky Ng)
 Billy Ching Sau Yat - Roadlock Cop #2
 Billy Chow - Yau's Bodyguard
 Robert Samuels - Yau's Bodyguard
 James Tien - Monk Taoist Foster (as Tin Chuen)
 Paul Chun - Gambler (as Chun Pui)
 Jameson Lam - Wedding Thug
 Garry Chan - Wedding Thug
 Hon Ping - Thug
 Tsim Siu-Ling - Thug
 Jue Wan-Sing - Thug
 Kwan Kwok-Chung - Thug
 Kwan Yung - Thug
 Chan Sek - Thug
 Ouyang Sha-fei - Mahjong Player
 Man Wah Tsui - Lottery Hostess
 Clifton Ko - TV Crew Member (as Clifton C.S. Ko)
 Norman Ng
 Huang Kai-Sen
 Frank Liu
 Jobic Wong
 Yuet Yue Chan
 Simon Yip
 Chiu Sek-Man
 Wong Man-Shing
 Leung Sam

External links 
 
 

1991 films
1990s Cantonese-language films
Hong Kong action comedy films
Hong Kong martial arts films
1991 action comedy films
1991 martial arts films
Hong Kong martial arts comedy films
Films about gambling
Hong Kong ghost films
Films set in Hong Kong
Films shot in Hong Kong
Films directed by Clifton Ko
1990s Hong Kong films